South Brook is a tributary of Mehoopany Creek in Luzerne County and Wyoming County, in Pennsylvania, in the United States. Wild trout are present in the stream and it has one named tributary, which is known as Opossum Brook.

Course
South Brook begins in a wetland in Ross Township, Luzerne County. It flows northeast for several tenths of a mile and briefly enters Forkston Township, Wyoming County before turning south-southeast and reentering Ross Township, Luzerne County. The stream passes through a small unnamed pond and turns east, entering another wetland. Upon leaving this wetland, it enters Lake Township, Luzerne County and turns northeast for a few tenths of a mile before entering a third wetland. The stream then reenters Forkston Township, Wyoming County and meanders north through three more wetlands. It then turns northwest for a few miles, entering a deep valley. After more than a mile, its valley broadens and it continues flowing northwest for several tenths of a mile before receiving the tributary Opossum Brook from the left. The stream then turns north for a few tenths of a mile before reaching its confluence with Mehoopany Creek.

Tributaries
South Brook has one named tributary, which is known as Opossum Brook.

Geography and geology
South Brook is a small and secluded stream. It flows in a generally northwesterly direction.

South Brook is one of five large brooks to descend from a high, flat-topped mountain that separates the Mehoopany Creek watershed from the Bowman Creek watershed. Going from southwest to northeast, South Brook is the first of these brooks. An especially high summit of the mountain runs from the headwaters of the stream to the headwaters of Henry Lott Brook.

In the late 1800s, coal was reported to appear at the headwaters of South Brook. The stream was described a s a "cold, clear mountain stream" in the late 1940s.

Watershed
The mouth of the stream is in the United States Geological Survey quadrangle of Dutch Mountain. However, its source is in the quadrangle of Sweet Valley. The stream joins Mehoopany Creek near Bellasylva.

There are some Pennsylvania Game Commission roads in the watershed of South Brook.

History and recreation
South Brook was entered into the Geographic Names Information System on August 2, 1979. Its identifier in the Geographic Names Information System is 1199981.

South Brook has been in Pennsylvania State Game Lands Number 57 since at least the late 1940s. It has also been noted for its trout fishing opportunities for a similar length of time.

Biology
Wild trout naturally reproduce in South Brook from its headwaters downstream to its mouth. The stream was noted to have a good wild trout population in the 1986 issue of the Pennsylvania Angler. The stream is classified as a High-Quality Coldwater Fishery.

See also
Becker Brook, next tributary of Mehoopany Creek going downstream
Bellas Brook, next tributary of Mehoopany Creek going upstream
List of rivers of Pennsylvania

References

Tributaries of Mehoopany Creek